Zhu Zhengjun (born 16 November 1971) is a Chinese former cyclist. He competed in two events at the 1992 Summer Olympics.

References

External links
 

1971 births
Living people
Chinese male cyclists
Olympic cyclists of China
Cyclists at the 1992 Summer Olympics
Place of birth missing (living people)
Asian Games medalists in cycling
Asian Games silver medalists for China
Cyclists at the 1994 Asian Games
Medalists at the 1994 Asian Games
20th-century Chinese people